Rose Hill Historic District may refer to:

Rose Hill Historic District (Sioux City, Iowa), listed on the NRHP in Iowa
Rose Hill Historic District (Versailles, Kentucky), listed on the NRHP in Kentucky

See also
Rose Hill, Maryland (historic site)